Thomasia multiflora is a species of flowering plant in the family Malvaceae and is endemic to the south-west of Western Australia. It is a low, spreading shrub with broadly egg-shaped leaves and mauve flowers.

Description
Each flower is on a short pedicel with hairy, linear bracteoles at the base. The sepals are mauve, joined for about half their length, and there are no petals.

Taxonomy and naming
Thomasia multiflora was first formally described in 1904 by Ernst Georg Pritzel in Botanische Jahrbücher für Systematik, Pflanzengeschichte und Pflanzengeographie from specimens collected near King George Sound. The specific epithet (multiflora) means "many-flowered".

Distribution and habitat
This thomasia grows in shrubland and woodland in winter-wet areas and on granite outcrops from near Walpole to Albany in the Esperance Plains bioregion of south-western Western Australia.

Conservation status
Thomasia multiflora is classified as "Priority One" by the Government of Western Australia Department of Biodiversity, Conservation and Attractions, meaning that it is known from only one or a few locations which are potentially at risk.

References

multiflora
Rosids of Western Australia
Plants described in 1904
Taxa named by Ernst Pritzel